Stan or Stanley Mitchell may refer to:

 Stan Mitchell (Australian footballer) (born 1952), Australian rules footballer
 Stan Mitchell (American football) (1944–2012), American football fullback
 Stanley Mitchell (1932–2011), British translator, academic, and author
 Stanley Mitchell (cricketer) (born 1946), Irish cricketer
 Stanley Robert Mitchell (1881–1963), Australian metallurgist, amateur mineralogist and ethnologist
 Stanley "Stan" Mitchell, a fictional protagonist of the song "Stan"